Tengkolok, also known as  Tanjak, Destar (Minangkabau: Deta; Kelantan-Pattani: Semutar) is a traditional Malay or Indonesian and  male headgear. It is made from long songket cloth folded and tied in a particular style (solek). Nowadays, it is usually worn in ceremonious functions, such as royal ceremonies by royalties, and wedding ceremonies by grooms.

Name
The terms tengkolok, Tanjak, and setanjak are synonyms; the word "tengkolok" also refers to "headgear or headcover worn by women", but the definition of women's headgear is rarely used today.

However, some people say that tengkolok, tanjak, and destar are different in terms of cloth type or tying even though the purpose is the same, which the tengkolok is a headgear made from cloth of good quality and its tying has many layers and tapers to tip; destar has low tying and its tying layers are fewer than tengkolok; tanjak has tying much like tengkolok, the only difference is that its cloth is simple and thin.

Solek
Tengkolok is made in various forms, with different types and designs of cloth, depending on the social status of its dress. The general term for different forms of tengkolok is solek. Each solek also has its different special name, for instance: the tengkolok worn by Yang di-Pertuan Agong during the coronation ceremony is known as Solek Dendam Tak Sudah (Persistent Vengeance Style).

Every Malay king has their particular solek. For example, the Sultan of Selangor wears a richly golden yellow Solek Balung Raja (Royal Crest Style) when attending a coronation ceremony or his birthday ceremony.

Gallery

See also

 National costume of Indonesia
 Culture of Indonesia
 Malaysian cultural outfits
 Culture of Malaysia

Note

Headgear
Indonesian clothing
Malay clothing
Indonesian culture
Kerchiefs